Dead Heat (released in the Philippines as Iron Cops) is a 1988 American buddy cop action zombie comedy film directed by Mark Goldblatt and starring Treat Williams, Joe Piscopo, Darren McGavin, Lindsay Frost and Vincent Price. The film is about an LAPD police officer who is murdered while attempting to arrest zombies who have been reanimated by the head of Dante Laboratories in order to carry out violent armed robberies, and decides to get revenge with the help of his former partner.

Plot
Detectives Roger Mortis and Doug Bigelow are called to the scene of a rather violent jewelry store robbery. The robbers take on a squadron of police in a messy shootout, but neither seems affected when they are riddled with bullets. Thanks to the combined, albeit extreme measures of Mortis and Bigelow, they are able to take out the criminals. Narrowly avoiding termination their captain assigns them to the investigation. Meanwhile, a coroner friend of Roger's, Rebecca informs the detectives that the two bodies they had brought in had previously been to the morgue: not only do they have autopsy scars, but she herself clearly remembers performing the autopsy and has pictures to prove it, suggesting they simply got up and left the morgue of their own volition.

There is a preservative chemical compound found in the bodies that connect the pair of detectives to a company that had ordered a great amount of it recently. Mortis and Bigelow investigate and meet the company's head public relations person, Randi James who gives them a tour of the facility. When Doug wanders off to investigate a suspicious room, he encounters the reanimated corpse of a biker on a strange machine. A fight ensues, Roger comes to aid his partner, and in the fray, he is knocked into a decompression room used to humanely kill failed test animals and is asphyxiated to death when an unknown person activates the room.

Encountering the machine, and realizing it is capable of bringing people back from the dead, Rebecca and Doug successfully bring Roger back from the dead. He says he feels fine, yet he has no heart beat and his skin is cold to the touch, Rebecca surmises he has about twelve hours before the reanimation process ends and he dissolves into a puddle of mush. Roger decides to take this time to find and exact his vengeance on the person who killed him, as well as solve the case he and Doug are working on. They go to Randi's house just shortly before she is attacked by two more undead thugs, which the partners are able to subdue. Randi says that she is the daughter of a rich industrialist, and the owner of the company she works for until his death, Arthur P. Laudermilk.

The two of them pay another visit to Rebecca, who says that she might have found a way to keep Roger in healthy condition indefinitely, but the unsure nature of the theory has him decide to spend his final hours finding the man who killed him. Doug splits from Roger, agreeing to meet back at Randi's home, while Roger and Randi pay a visit to Laudermilk's tomb. Randi admits she's not his daughter, more a protégé or daughter he'd never had. While there, they encounter a numeric code, which Roger discovers later is a vital clue. Upon returning to Randi's home, they find Doug dead, having been suspended and drowned in a fish tank for some time. Randi tells Roger that she too is undead, having been one of Laudermilk's first test subjects for resurrection, shortly before abruptly dissolving while asking for Roger's forgiveness.

Roger confronts the head coroner Dr. Ernest McNab, Rebecca's boss, who was linked to the secret numeric code that Roger had found. Roger also has determined that McNab reanimated the robbers to steal for him all while keeping his hands clean, in addition to killing Doug and himself. But McNab turns the tables on Roger, capturing him, then locking him in an ambulance with Rebecca's dead body, after killing her, in order to wait out his last hour to dissolution. He releases the brakes on the ambulance and puts it in neutral, sending it careening down the highway into a massive collision, from which he emerges, even more zombified and scarred almost beyond recognition. He returns to the laboratory where McNab and a resurrected Laudermilk are pitching the resurrection machine to a group of very rich clients. Mortis charges in and in the ensuing crossfire between him and McNab's men a few of the rich clients are killed, leaving Laudermilk cowering in a corner.

McNab reveals a test subject; Doug, resurrected by the machine. But because he's been dead for hours, the brain deterioration leaves him little more than an obedient zombie with no memory of who Roger is. Before he can obey McNab's orders to kill Mortis, however, Roger manages to trigger Doug's short-term memory and bring him back to normal. The pair go after McNab who immediately kills himself before they can do anything. Roger and Doug put McNab onto the resurrection table and resurrect him. But to exact revenge, Roger starts the resurrection process again and it overloads, causing a screaming McNab to explode in the machine. Despite Laudermilk's pleas and promises of eternal life, the pair then destroy the machine completely, leaving the room pondering about the afterlife and reincarnation; Doug's fond wish of being reincarnated as a girl's bicycle seat intriguing the both of them. The film ends with Roger stating, "This could be the end of a beautiful friendship."

Cast
 Treat Williams as Roger Mortis
 Joe Piscopo as Doug Bigelow
 Lindsay Frost as Randi James
 Darren McGavin as Dr. Ernest McNab
 Vincent Price as Arthur P. Loudermilk
 Clare Kirkconnell as Dr. Rebecca Smythers
 Keye Luke as Mr. Thule
 Robert Picardo as Lieutenant Herzog
 Mel Stewart as Captain Mayberry
 Professor Toru Tanaka as Butcher
 Martha Quinn as Newscaster
 Shane Black as Patrolman
 Beth Toussaint as Lab Technician
 Ron Taylor as Shoot Out Zombie

Production
According to The Hollywood Reporters chart from 1 September 1987, principal photography began on Dead Heat on 19 August 1987 in Southern California. The Los Angeles Times mentioned Darren Star as a writer on the film along with Terry Black. The film's credits only list Black as the screenwriter.

Release
Dead Heat opened in Los Angeles and New York on May 6, 1988. In the Philippines, the film was released as Iron Cops on November 10, 1988.

Reception
Dead Heat received negative reviews from The New York Times and the Los Angeles Times. The film has an 11% rating on Rotten Tomatoes from 9 critics.

See also
List of horror films of 1988

References

External links

1988 films
1988 action films
1980s buddy cop films
1980s science fiction films
1988 directorial debut films
1988 horror films
American action comedy films
American action horror films
American buddy cop films
American buddy comedy films
American comedy horror films
American films about revenge
American science fiction action films
American science fiction comedy films
American science fiction horror films
American zombie comedy films
Buddy comedy films
Resurrection in film
New World Pictures films
American exploitation films
American splatter films
1980s English-language films
Films directed by Mark Goldblatt
1980s American films